Rilke is a crater on Mercury.  Its name was adopted by the International Astronomical Union (IAU) in 1976. Rilke is named for the German poet Rainer Maria Rilke.

There is an irregular depression near the center of the crater.  Such depressions in similar craters (for example Glinka, Gibran, or Picasso) are thought to be caused by volcanism.

To the north of Rilke are Matabei and Pigalle craters.  To the southwest are Po Ya and Sōtatsu.

References

Impact craters on Mercury